The Georges Valentine Shipwreck Site is the site of the historic shipwreck of an Italian barkentine off the coast of Hutchinson Island in Martin County, Florida, with the nearest landmark being the House of Refuge at Gilbert's Bar.

The iron-hulled barque was built in Wallasey, England in 1869 by Bowdler Chaffer & Company for S. Meyers & Company. Originally christened Cape Clear with Lloyd's of London in 1870, she started her career as a screw steamboat with auxiliary sail carrying passengers on the Australia - Liverpool run.  She was purchased by a French firm based in Bordeaux in 1889, re-christened Georges Valentine and turned into a sailing bark by being stripped of all steam machinery except the boiler. Rigged as a three-masted barkentine, she was then sold to a firm based in Dunkirk, northern France. In 1895, she was sold to Mortolo & Simonetti, based in Genoa, Italy. She  was based in Camogli, northern Italy and transported lumber regularly from Pensacola, Florida to South America.

In October 1904, the Georges Valentine, with a crew of twelve men commanded by Captain Prospero Mortolo, sailed with a load of milled mahogany from Pensacola bound for Buenos Aires.  On 13 October 1904 the ship sighted Havana, Cuba, but she later hit a storm in the Florida Straits and was blown up the Atlantic coast of Florida where on 16 October 1904, despite her crew's attempts to keep her in deeper water, she ran aground in shallow water and wrecked off Hutchinson Island near Gilbert's Bar.  Five crew members perished. Their bodies were not recovered. The seven survivors found refuge at the House of Refuge just 100 yards from the wreck site, where the House of Refuge's keeper, Captain William E. Rea, rendered aid to them.

On 19 July 2006,  the Georges Valentine Shipwreck Site was added to the U.S. National Register of Historic Places. On 16 October 2006, it became the eleventh Florida Underwater Archaeological Preserve.

References

External links

 
 Museums in the Sea: Georges Valentine

National Register of Historic Places in Martin County, Florida
Shipwrecks of the Florida coast
Maritime incidents in 1904
Shipwrecks on the National Register of Historic Places in Florida
Florida Underwater Archaeological Preserves
1869 ships
Ships built on the River Mersey
October 1904 events